California's 52nd district may refer to:

 California's 52nd congressional district
 California's 52nd State Assembly district